Bernard Silverman (August 30, 1838 – May 13, 1898) was an American politician from New York.

Life 
Silverman was born on August 30, 1838 in New York City, New York. His parents were German immigrants from Bavaria who immigrated to America a year before he was born.

Silverman attended public school and the Brooklyn City Institute. He worked as a bookkeeper after reaching his majority. He also worked as a woolen merchant in Manhattan at one point.

Silverman was active with the Democratic Party since 1859, initially in New York City and later in Brooklyn. In 1874, he was elected to the New York State Assembly as a Democrat, representing the Kings County 8th District (Wards 15, 17, and 18 of Brooklyn). He served in the Assembly in 1875.

Silverman later worked as a clerk in the Ewen Street Police Court in Williamsburg under Justice Watson. He was retained under Justices Laimbeer and Lemon.

Silverman was a Master of the Mount Neboh Lodge of the Freemasons and was a member of the Royal Arch Masonry. His wife died two years before him. He had three sons (two of whom worked in Chicago, Illinois) and a daughter, Dr. Hattie Ticehurst.

Silverman died at home after a brief illness from a complication of diseases on May 13, 1898. He was buried in Salem Fields Cemetery.

References

External links 

 The Political Graveyard

1838 births
1898 deaths
American people of German-Jewish descent
Politicians from Brooklyn
19th-century American merchants
19th-century American politicians
Democratic Party members of the New York State Assembly
Jewish American state legislators in New York (state)
American Freemasons
Burials at Salem Fields Cemetery